The McLaren MCL60 is a Formula One car designed and constructed by McLaren under the direction of James Key to compete in the 2023 Formula One World Championship. 

The car made its competitive début at the 2023 Bahrain Grand Prix. It is driven by Lando Norris and Oscar Piastri, Norris for his fifth season with McLaren and Piastri in his rookie year.

Background

Name 
The car was originally referred to by McLaren and the press as the MCL37, a continuation of the numbering scheme that began in 1981 with the McLaren MP4/1 (although the MP4 prefix was replaced by MCL in 2017 following the departure of Ron Dennis from the team). However, McLaren announced that the car would be named the MCL60 to commemorate 60 years since Bruce McLaren founded the team in 1963.

Development context 

A new generation of technical regulations began in the 2022 season. The MCL36, the MCL60's immediate predecessor, appeared competitive during its first testing appearance yet proved to have a significant issue with brake overheating. These issues limited its performance capabilities in the early stages of the season and delayed much of the car's development.

Then-team principal Andreas Seidl stated in September 2022 that only part of the MCL36's concept would be continued in its successor. Technical director James Key later revealed that the team had realised in September 2022 that the regulation changes to floor height would have an unavoidable negative impact on the car given its overall design philosophy, and began work on a new concept. However, the new concept had not matured enough to be used at launch, and it was delayed for introduction during the early season.

Key said the team hoped the MCL60 would require less in-season development compared to the MCL36. In November 2022, Seidl stated he believed the team's struggles with the MCL36 would have an impact on the MCL60, namely that the lack of testing for the MCL36 and the time required to address its brake issues had delayed the start of development for the MCL60. Seidl, who was originally set to leave the team at the end of 2025 for the incoming Audi project, departed in mid December 2022 to fill the vacancy at Sauber caused by the sudden exit of chief executive officer Frédéric Vasseur. Seidl was immediately replaced by Andrea Stella, who had been McLaren's executive director of racing.

Initial design and development 
At its launch, the car was considered an evolution of its predecessor – which had itself undergone heavy development during the 2022 season. It retained the unusual front pullrod, rear pushrod suspension layout that was reintroduced with the MCL36. The MCL60 featured tighter sidepod geometry with a more aggressive undercut, partly intended to free up space for ground effect inlet tunnels. The radiator inlet on the engine cover was lengthened, closer to the style of the inlet seen on the Ferrari F1-75.

The team stated that they were confident they had addressed the shortcomings of the MCL36, broadly labelled as aerodynamics and tyre management. Despite this, Stella said the team was "[n]ot entirely happy for the launch car" and intended to introduce substantial upgrades beginning in the fourth round of the season, the Azerbaijan Grand Prix. It was later revealed that these upgrades had been in development since September 2022 when McLaren decided to change design course entirely. Norris said that he had advocated for McLaren to change their design philosophy to prioritise driveability rather than ultimate performance. He said certain undesirable design characteristics were persisting in McLaren cars across his four seasons with the team and through several rule changes, but also said that he did not expect to know if the team had successfully addressed this until the pre-season test.

Livery 
The MCL60 livery largely resembled the design débuted on the MCL36, but with additional exposed carbon fibre to save weight. As with all McLaren Formula One cars since the MCL35, the livery was applied with a vinyl wrap rather than paint, which is more lightweight and aerodynamically efficient compared to painted cars, as well as quicker to prepare.

Competition and development history

Pre-season
Stella stated that the primary goal for the 2023 season was for the team to re-establish itself as the leading midfield team. The team reiterated during the pre-season test at Bahrain International Circuit that it was not satisfied with the launch specification car, especially its excessive aerodynamic drag. Piastri said the MCL60 experienced the same limitations as the MCL36, which he tested in the official 2022 post-season test.

Opening rounds 
Norris qualified eleventh and Piastri eighteenth for the first race of the season, the Bahrain Grand Prix. Ahead of the race, Stella and Norris both agreed that McLaren could out-develop its rivals during the course of the season, saying that the issues the team faced were fixable. During the race, Piastri had risen to twelfth place before his car suffered an electrical issue. The team attempted to fix the issue by switching steering wheels in the pits, but the fault was located further down the steering column and could not be rectified, meaning Piastri retired on his début. Norris also suffered reliability issues, hampered by a loss of pneumatic pressure from the Mercedes power unit. The issue limited gearbox performance and forced Norris to pit every ten laps or so in order for the pneumatic pressure tank to be topped up, and he finished seventeenth and last on track after completeing six pit stops, motivated by McLaren's desire to collect additional data on car performance. The result meant the team were classified tenth and last in the World Constructors' Championship. Despite the reliability issues, Norris stated that he believed the MCL60 was not as far off the pace as some commentators had argued.

The MCL60 featured a new diffuser upgrade and a track-specific rear wing for the Saudi Arabian Grand Prix. Norris was forced to take his second engine of the season after the team determined the unit that failed in the first race could not be reused. Piastri qualified for the race in ninth, and started eighth after another driver received a grid penalty. Norris, meanwhile, clipped a wall and damaged the steering system on his car. The damage could not be repaired by the end of the first stage of qualifying, leaving him nineteenth on the grid.

Complete Formula One results 
(key)

Notes
 * – Championship in progress.

References

External links 

 McLaren official website

MP4-60
McLaren MCL60